is a programming game developed and published by Nintendo for the Nintendo Switch. It was announced on May 5, 2021, and released on June 11, 2021.

Gameplay 
In Game Builder Garage, the player uses a visual programming language centralized on the concept of creatures called Nodon. The Nodon represent various facets of input, game output, logic, and on-screen objects, such as a Stick Nodon that reports input from the Joy-Con analog stick or a Person Nodon that represents an on-screen character. The player builds a program by adding Nodon and making connections between the various nodes on Nodon, such as connecting the Stick Nodon to the Person Nodon as to tie the analog stick to movement of the character on-screen. Nodon are available to interface nearly all features of the Switch and Joy-Con, including the infrared sensors and motion controls. 

The game features a lesson mode to guide the player through using the Nodon language and to help them understand some of the principles of game development through a series of seven built-in games that the player can create.

Games built within Game Builder Garage can support up to eight different Joy-Con, effectively allowing up to eight-player local multiplayer games to be built.

Game Builder Garage has a share function, that allows creators to upload their games and share them with other people. However, it does not feature a game browser, but rather a code has to be shared by the creator for other people to access it. Fans of the game have been creating their own platforms for sharing their games; the most popular one being MyGarage Games.

The game also allows for the use of commercial USB computer mice.

Development 
The game was announced on May 5, 2021, being released on June 11, 2021. Game Builder Garage was developed specifically by Nintendo EPD 4, the division behind games like Nintendo Labo, Ring Fit Adventure, 1-2-Switch, Miitopia and many more. The game was directed by Naoki Masuda, a programmer at Nintendo who had previously worked on Nintendo Labo and the Pikmin series.

In a developer interview, Masuda and programmer Kosuke Teshima described the Nintendo Labo series, particularly the VR Kit, as a key inspiration for Game Builder Garage. After seeing non-programmer Nintendo employees using the Toy-Con Garage to create their own games, Masuda described that he wanted to "find a way to make it easier for people to have the fun of creating games through trial and error." The developers tested the game on elementary school students interested in programming to ensure the lessons were accessible to beginners.

Reception 

Game Builder Garage received "generally favorable" reviews according to review aggregator Metacritic. Nintendo Life Alex Olney praised the game's tutorials, but criticized the lack of visual options given to players. IGN Seth Macy enjoyed the amount of options and tools the game gives to players. Game Builder Garage was described by Polygon as a followup to Nintendo Labo. It was also the bestselling retail game during its first week of release in Japan, with 71,241 physical copies being sold across the country. As of December 31, 2021, Game Builder Garage had sold 1.06 million units in total worldwide.

Creators have recreated several notable games using the software, including recreations of Super Mario Kart, F-Zero, and Sonic the Hedgehog.

Notes

References 

2021 video games
Nintendo games
Nintendo Switch games
Nintendo Switch-only games
Programming games
Video game development software
Video games developed in Japan
Video games with user-generated gameplay content
Multiplayer and single-player video games